Charles Bernard Scaggs (born October 25, 1965) is an American professional wrestler, better known by the ring name 2 Cold Scorpio (sometimes spelled Too Cold Scorpio). He is best known for his appearances with World Championship Wrestling, Extreme Championship Wrestling and World Wrestling Federation (as Flash Funk) throughout the 1990s, along with his appearances in Japan for New Japan Pro-Wrestling and Pro Wrestling Noah.

Championships held by 2 Cold Scorpio over the course of his career include the ECW World Tag Team Championship, ECW World Television Championship, GHC Tag Team Championship and WCW World Tag Team Championship.

Professional wrestling career

Early career (1985–1992) 
Scaggs made his professional wrestling debut in 1985, adopting the ring name 2 Cold Scorpio. He wrestled in various independent promotions in the United States, until, on the recommendation of Big Van Vader, he decided to go to New Japan Pro-Wrestling, where he trained in the NJPW Dojo. He also wrestled in Europe and Mexico.

World Championship Wrestling (1992–1994) 
2 Cold Scorpio debuted in World Championship Wrestling (WCW) on November 18, 1992, as Ron Simmons' mystery partner at Clash of the Champions XXI. In June 1993, he challenged Barry Windham for the NWA World Heavyweight Championship, but lost to Windham at Clash of the Champions XXIII. He had a brief reign as World Tag Team Champion with Marcus Alexander Bagwell in October 1993.  Although he was released in April 1994, 2 Cold Scorpio competed on the WCW-promoted pay-per-view When Worlds Collide in November 1994 and the WCW/New Japan produced pay-per-view Collision in Korea in April 1995.

Extreme Championship Wrestling (1994–1996) 
2 Cold Scorpio debuted in Extreme Championship Wrestling (ECW) in 1994, where he had four reigns as World Television Champion and one reign as World Tag Team Champion with The Sandman. He had feuds with wrestlers such as Taz, Shane Douglas, Sabu, and Mikey Whipwreck. In August 1994, Scorpio had another chance at the NWA World Heavyweight Championship, this time in a tournament; he made it all the way to the finals, before losing to Shane Douglas. Following his departure for the WWF, 2 Cold Scorpio returned to ECW for one night at House Party in 1998 as a mystery opponent for Taz. In 1996, he would return to Japan to wrestle for Tokyo Pro Wrestling, under the masked alter ego, Black Wazuma.

World Wrestling Federation (1996–1999) 

2 Cold Scorpio made his WWF debut on November 17, 1996, at Survivor Series, under the name Flash Funk. His gimmick involved wearing tights with large lapels, and entering the arena dancing with a pair of "Fly Girls" or "Funkettes" while wearing a large hat and fur coat. Towards the end of his first WWF run, Funk reverted to his 2 Cold Scorpio name, later shortening it to "Scorpio", and began teaming with former WCW teammate and friend Ron Simmons, as well as Terry Funk through most of 1998. In mid-1998, he competed in the WWF's Brawl for All tournament, replacing Ken Shamrock. He lost in the quarterfinals to The Godfather.

In late 1998, Scorpio became a member of Al Snow's J.O.B. Squad, often being a regular on WWF Shotgun Saturday Night. In February 1999, 2 Cold Scorpio requested time off due to personal problems, but was instead released from the WWF. Scorpio's last WWF match would be him and Hardcore Holly losing to Owen Hart and Jeff Jarrett on the February 6, 1999 edition of Shotgun Saturday Night, ultimately being the J.O.B. Squad's last televised match.

Return to ECW (1999–2000) 
2 Cold Scorpio next made sporadic appearances for ECW, which included a challenge against then-champion Mike Awesome for the ECW World Heavyweight Championship on the December 10, 1999, edition of ECW on TNN. His last ECW match was a lost to Masato Tanaka at CyberSlam (2000).

Pro Wrestling Noah (2000–2006) 
2 Cold Scorpio competed for All Japan Pro Wrestling until native members of its roster defected to form Pro Wrestling Noah in 2000, and both Scorpio and Vader followed.

Scorpio would team with Vader when he debuted in October 2000. Both had a strong dominance in the tag team division, where they had a great number of victories on television and pay-per-views. Like Vader, Scorpio earned many singles victories against several of the roster's Japanese wrestlers. At this time Scorpio would receive major pops and fanfare from the Japanese audience, who would often cheer and jive for his charismatic entrances and root for him in matches as a babyface. Because Vader already had a grudge feud with Jun Akiyama, Scorpio would take Vader's side and help him defeat Akiyama and whatever Japanese wrestler Akiyama teamed with at the moment.

Vader and Scorpio would emerge victorious in the grudge feud by defeating Jun Akiyama and Akitoshi Saito on an October 19, 2001 pay-per-view, where they became the inaugural GHC Tag Team Champions. They would lose the titles to Mitsuharu Misawa and Yoshinari Ogawa on November 30.

Scorpio and Vader continued teaming throughout 2002, and despite them not winning the titles again, they continued having many victories in the tag team and singles division throughout 2002. Vader's last appearance in NOAH was in January 2003, and Doug Williams would become Scorpio's replacement that spring.

Scorpio and Doug Williams won the GHC Tag Team Championship in January 2005. On November 5, 2005, Scorpio won the GHC Openweight Hardcore Championship against Yoshinobu Kanemaru in a pay-per-view match.

Return to WWE (2006–2007) 
In 2006, 2 Cold Scorpio signed a contract with World Wrestling Entertainment. Upon joining the promotion, he returned to using his Flash Funk character in the WWE developmental promotion Deep South Wrestling until he was released on May 11, 2007, without ever appearing on WWE television. On the 15th anniversary of WWE Raw on December 10, 2007, 2 Cold Scorpio participated in a battle royal as "Flash Funk", eliminating Steve Blackman while eliminating himself in the process.

Independent circuit (2005–present) 

On June 10, 2005, 2 Cold Scorpio wrestled at the ECW reunion event Hardcore Homecoming, defeating Kid Kash. In late 2007, 2 Cold Scorpio joined Booker T's Pro Wrestling Alliance promotion, based in Houston, Texas. He wrestled occasionally in Pasadena, Texas, at the city's convention center, and he participated in a feud with heel wrestler and student Gustavo Mendoza. His last PWA match was on February 16, 2008 at Texas Tapout against Chris Adams. On August 8, 2010, 2 Cold Scorpio wrestled at Total Nonstop Action Wrestling's ECW reunion show, Hardcore Justice, defeating C. W. Anderson. On April 28, 2012, 2 Cold Scorpio wrestled Shane Douglas in the main event of Extreme Reunion (a wrestling event promoted by Douglas) in Philadelphia, Pennsylvania. During the match, two masked men got involved. One was Kevin Sullivan, who attacked Douglas. The other was former ECW owner Tod Gordon, who hugged 2 Cold Scorpio. Douglas pinned 2 Cold Scorpio with a twisting sunset flip. 2 Cold Scorpio made his debut for Chikara in September 2012, when he, Jerry Lynn and Tommy Dreamer entered the 2012 King of Trios as "The Extreme Trio", defeating Team WWF (1-2-3 Kid, Aldo Montoya and Tatanka) in their first round match. The following day, The Extreme Trio was eliminated from the tournament by Team ROH (Mike Bennett, Matt Jackson and Nick Jackson).

On February 2, 2013, 2 Cold Scorpio defeated A. C. H. in the main event of the first ever National Pro Wrestling Day to become the 2013 Rey De Voladores. On June 23, 2013, 2 Cold Scorpio was defeated by John Hennigan in a match for the FWE Heavyweight Championship at House of Hardcore 2. On September 2, 2017, 2 Cold Scorpio unsuccessfully challenged Hannibal for the Great North Wrestling Canadian Championship at the Hawkesbury Bike Fest 2017 in Hawkesbury, Ontario. On February 18, 2018, 2 Cold Scorpio won the WPW Heavyweight title at Cheltenham Town Hall by defeating Kendo Kashin. On August 3, 2018, 2 Cold Scorpio competed in the 2018 Scenic City Invitational Tournament held in Soddy Daisy, Tennessee, losing in the first round to AJ Gray.  The following night Scorpio defeated Darius Lockhart in non-tournament action. As of July 2019, 2 Cold Scorpio has taken the role of head trainer at the Rocky Mountain Pro Wrestling Academy in Golden, Colorado. Within the Rocky Mountain Pro promotion, he also has a large role in producing the live television product they air on Right Now TV, Fight Network UK and Twitch.tv. 2 Cold Scorpio is also the current Rocky Mountain Pro tag team champion alongside tag team partner Airborne Alex Anthony after winning the championship at their Milestone 9 Pay Per View on June 30, 2019. On September 10, 2020 2 Cold Scorpio made his debut for Game Changer Wrestling as part of their For The Culture event. He was defeated by AR Fox. On October 22, 2021 he debuted with PCW Ultra in a losing effort as he was defeated by The Blood Hunter with Kevin Sullivan.

Personal life
During a Ring of Honor's Straight Shootin interview in 2004, Scaggs admitted to hard drug use while he was in ECW and WWF, but it had been significantly accelerated during his stint in WWF due to the fact that he was simply making more money and thus had the opportunity to use more. Scaggs regretted his covert lifestyle at the time, and wondered  that if he had admitted to WWF and himself that he had a problem, his career might have lasted longer in WWF. He also admitted to have kicked his hard drug use several years ago, although still actively uses marijuana.

Championships and accomplishments
 All Star Wrestling Alliance
 ASWA Heavyweight Championship (1 time)
Big Time Wrestling
BTW Heavyweight Championship (1 time)
Canadian Wrestling's Elite
CWE Canadian Unified Junior Heavyweight Championship (1 time)
 Chikara
 Rey de Voladores (2013)
 Extreme Championship Wrestling
 ECW World Tag Team Championship (1 time) – with The Sandman
 ECW World Television Championship (4 times)
 German Wrestling Federation
 GWF Heavyweight Championship (1 time)
 GWF Heavyweight Title Tournament (1999)
 Hardcore Hall of Fame
Class of 2014
High Volume Pro Wrestling
HVPW Hall of Fame (2015)
 H20 Wrestling Center
Hall of Fame (2021)
 Pacific Championship Wrestling
 PCW Heavyweight Championship (1 time)
 Peach State Wrestling
 PSW Cordele City Heavyweight Championship (1 time, last)
 Pro Wrestling Illustrated
Ranked No. 201 of the 500 best singles wrestlers of the "PWI Years" in 2003
Ranked No. 33 of the top 500 singles wrestlers in the PWI 500 in 1995
 Pro Wrestling Noah
 GHC Openweight Hardcore Championship (1 time)
 GHC Tag Team Championship (2 times) – with Vader (1) and Doug Williams (1)
 GHC Tag Team Title Tournament (2001) - with Vader
 Pro Wrestling Unplugged
 PWU World Heavyweight Championship (3 times)
Rocky Mountain Pro
RMP Tag Team Championship (1 time) - with "Airborne" Alex Anthony
World Championship Wrestling
 WCW World Tag Team Championship (1 time) – with Marcus Alexander Bagwell
 Wrestling Observer Newsletter
 Best Wrestling Maneuver (1992) 450° splash
 Most Underrated Wrestler (1997)
 World Pro Wrestling
 WPW Championship (1 time)

References

External links
 
 
 
 

1965 births
20th-century professional wrestlers
21st-century professional wrestlers
Living people
African-American male professional wrestlers
American expatriates in Germany
American male professional wrestlers
ECW World Tag Team Champions
ECW World Television Champions
Professional wrestlers from Colorado
Sportspeople from Denver
Sportspeople from Greater Orlando
GHC Openweight Hardcore Champions
GHC Tag Team Champions
WCW World Tag Team Champions